Scarborough is a populated place in the parish of Christ Church, Barbados. It is a coastal area located at the far southern tip of Barbados. Scarborough has only one road with "small shacks and houses" along it.

See also
 List of cities, towns and villages in Barbados

References

Christ Church, Barbados
Populated coastal places in Barbados
Populated places in Barbados